The Orlando Lions were an American soccer team from Orlando, Florida which existed from 1985 to 1996.  Over the years, the Lions competed at both the amateur and professional levels including some seasons as an independent team.

The Lions is a nickname that has persisted in the area in connection with later efforts to bring pro soccer to the area. It is used as a nickname for the current Orlando City SC team, which played in the third-tier USL Pro league between 2010 and 2014, and now plays in Major League Soccer.

ASL/APSL
Founded in 1985, the Orlando Lions joined the third incarnation of the American Soccer League in 1988. The team joined the American Professional Soccer League in 1990 when the ASL merged with the Western Alliance. They merged with the Fort Lauderdale Strikers after the 1990 season. The club played in Orlando, Florida.

Year-by-year

Yearly average attendance
 1988 - 2,736
 1989 - 2,761
 1990 - not available

USISL
The second Orlando Lions were a soccer club based in Orlando, Florida. The team began in the USISL and, in 1995, moved to the USISL Premier League.

Year-by-year

Coaches
 Mark Dillon (1985-1988, 1992-1993)
 John Higgins (1988-1989)
 Gary Hindley (1989-1990)
 Sergio Mora (1995)
 Steve Lions (1995–96) Indoor

Yearly awards
USISL MVP
1992: Sheldon Lee

USISL Top Scorer
1993: Sheldon Lee

USISL All-Star
1992: Robin Chan
1993: Sheldon Lee, David Mackey

USISL Coach of the Year
1993: Mark Dillon

References

 
Defunct soccer clubs in Florida
American Soccer League (1988–89) teams
American Professional Soccer League teams
Soccer clubs in Orlando, Florida
Soccer clubs in Florida
1985 establishments in Florida
1996 disestablishments in Florida
Association football clubs established in 1985
Association football clubs disestablished in 1996